Tabaru is a North Halmahera language of Indonesia.

Phonology

Vowels
Tabaru has a simple five vowel system: a, e, i, o, u.

Consonants

Syllable structure and stress
On the surface level, Tabaru only allows syllables of the type (C)V. Words with an underlying final consonant add an echo vowel:  (/ngowak/) ′child′,  (/oker/) ′drink′,   (/sarim/) ′paddle′,  (/odom/) ′eat′,  (/palus/) ′answer′. The echo vowel is dropped when a suffix is added:  (/woisen/) ′hear′, but  (/woisen/ + /oka/) ′heard′. Stress regularly falls on the penultimate syllable, but shifts to the antepenultimate when the word takes an echo vowel.

References

North Halmahera languages